This is a list of Filipino saints, beati, venerables, and Servants of God recognized by the Catholic Church. The majority of these men and women of religious life were born, died, or lived within the Philippines.

Ferdinand Magellan's expedition of 1521 to the islands included Catholic priests and missionaries among the crew. Some Catholic missionaries became the explorers of the native lands while converting and coercing the Indios towards Christianism. Because of the Spanish colonization which had been started by Miguel López de Legazpi, Christianity was introduced as settling within Cebu. Cebu is a well known bastion of the Roman Catholic faith.

Catholics continue to contribute to Filipino religious life to the present day. Subsequently, several Filipino Catholics have been considered for sainthood over the past centuries. Most of these saints-to-be are from the 20th Century and moving forward. Very few from the Spanish era within the Philippines found their way to the various levels of Church "sanctity."

The first Filipino saint canonized was Lorenzo Ruiz, a married lay Dominican and member of the Rosarian Confraternity in dedication to Our Lady. Lorenzo died as a martyr of faith, during the persecutions in Nagasaki, Japan, where the Japanese rulers organized an anti-clerical campaign. Lorenzo Ruiz was beatified by Pope John Paul II in Manila in 1981 and was later canonized at St. Peter's Square, Vatican City in 1987. Twenty-five years later, the title of "saint" was bestowed upon another martyr, Pedro Calungsod.  Pedro was then canonized in October 2012 by Pope Benedict XVI.

Saints

 Lorenzo Ruiz (ca. 1600–1637), Married Layperson of the Archdiocese of Manila; Member of the Confraternity of the Rosary; Martyr (Manila, Philippines - Nagasaki, Japan)
 Declared Venerable: October 11, 1980
 Beatified: February 18, 1981, by Pope John Paul II
 Canonized: October 18, 1987, by Pope John Paul II
 Pedro Calungsod (1654–1672), Young Layperson of the Archdiocese of Cebu; Martyr (Cebu, Philippines - Tumon, Guam)
 Declared Venerable: January 27, 2000
 Beatified: March 5, 2000, by Pope John Paul II
 Canonized: October 21, 2012, by Pope Benedict XVI

Beatified
 Diego Luis de San Vitores (Diego Jerónimo de San Vitores y Alonso de Maluendo) (1627-1672), Professed Priest of the Jesuits; Martyr (Burgos, Spain - Cebu, Philippines - Tumon, Guam)
 Declared Venerable: November 9, 1984
 Beatified: October 6, 1985, by Pope John Paul II
 Eugenio Sanz-Orozco Mortera (José María of Manila) (1880-1936), Professed Priest of the Friars Minor Capuchin; Martyr (Manila, Philippines - Madrid, Spain)
 Declared Venerable: March 27, 2013
 Beatified: October 13, 2013, by Cardinal Angelo Amato
 Iustus Takayama Ukon (Hikogorō Shigetomo) (ca. 1552–1615), Layperson of the Archdiocese of Tokyo (Nara, Japan - Manila, Philippines)
 Declared Venerable: January 21, 2016
 Beatified: February 7, 2017, by Cardinal Angelo Amato

Venerables
 Isabel Larrañaga Ramírez (Isabel of the Heart of Jesus) (1836–1899), Founder of the Sisters of Charity of the Sacred Heart of Jesus (Manila, Philippines - Havana, Cuba)
 Declared Venerable: March 26, 1999
 Ignacia del Espíritu Santo de Juco (1663–1748), Founder of the Religious of the Virgin Mary (Manila, Philippines)
 Declared Venerable: July 6, 2007
 Joaquina Maria Mercedes Barcelo Pages (Consuelo Barcelo y Pages) (1857–1940), Cofounder of the Augustinian Sisters of Our Lady of Consolation (Barcelona, Spain - Manila, Philippines)
 Declared Venerable: December 20, 2012
 Aloysius Schwartz (1930–1992), Priest of the Archdiocese of Manila; Founder of the Sisters of Mary of Banneux and Brothers of Christ (Washington D.C., USA - Manila, Philippines)
 Declared Venerable: January 22, 2015
 Alfredo María Obviar (1889–1978), Bishop of Lucena; Founder of Missionary Catechists of Saint Thérèse of the Infant Jesus (Batangas - Quezon, Philippines)
 Declared Venerable: November 7, 2018
 María Beatriz del Rosario de Arroyo (Maria Rosario of the Visitation) (1884–1957), Founder of the Dominican Sisters of the Most Holy Rosary of the Philippines (Dominican Sisters of Molo) (Iloilo, Philippines)
 Declared Venerable: June 11, 2019
 Francisca del Espíritu Santo de Fuentes (1647–1711), Founder of the Dominican Sisters of St. Catherine of Siena (Manila, Philippines)
 Declared Venerable: July 5, 2019
 Teofilo Camomot (1914–1988), Coadjutor Archbishop of Cagayan de Oro; Titular Archbishop of Marcianopolis; Founder of the Daughters of Saint Teresa (Cebu, Philippines)
 Declared Venerable: May 21, 2022

Servants of God

 Jerónima Yañez de la Fuente (Jerónima of the Assumption) (1555–1630), Professed Religious of the Poor Clare Nuns (Toledo, Spain - Manila, Philippines)
 Francesco Palliola (1612–1648), Professed Priest of the Jesuits; Martyr (Naples, Italy - Zamboanga del Norte, Philippines)
 Cecilia Rosa de Jesús Talangpaz (1693–1731), Cofounder of the Augustinian Recollect Sisters (Bulacan - Manila, Philippines)
 Dionisia de Santa María Mitas Talangpaz (1691–1732), Cofounder of the Augustinian Recollect Sisters (Bulacan - Manila, Philippines)
 Ines Joaquina Vicenta Barcelo Pages (Rita) (1843–1904), Founder of the Augustinian Sisters of Our Lady of Consolation (Barcelona, Spain - Manila, Philippines)
 María Ángeles Rodríguez de Rivera Chicote (1882–1936), Layperson of the Diocese of Málaga; Martyr (Maguindanao, Philippines – Málaga, Spain)
 Wilhelm Finnemann (1882–1942), Professed Priest of the Society of the Divine Word; Apostolic Vicariate of Calapan; Martyr (North Rhine-Westphalia, Germany - Batangas, Philippines)
 Joseph Verbis Lafleur (1912–1944), Priest of the Military Ordinate of the United States (Louisiana, USA - Zamboanga del Norte, Philippines)
 Alfredo Verzosa (1877–1954), Bishop of Lipa; Founder of the Missionary Catechists of the Sacred Heart (Ilocos Sur, Philippines)
 Florencia Cuesta Valluerca (Trinidad of the Sacred Heart of Jesus) (1904–1967), Professed Religious of the Carmelite Nuns of the Ancient Observance (Madrid, Spain - Manila, Philippines)
 Carlo Braga (1889–1971), Professed Priest of the Salesians of Don Bosco (Sondrio, Italy - Pampanga, Philippines)
 Dalisay Lazaga (1940–1971), Professed Religious of the Canossians Daughters of Charity (Laguna - Manila, Philippines)
 Amador Tajanlangit Sr. (1911–1977), Married Layperson of the Archdiocese of Jaro (Iloilo, Philippines)
 George J. Willmann (1897–1977), Professed Priest of the Jesuits (New York, USA - Manila, Philippines)
 Richard Michael Fernando (1970–1996), Professed Cleric of the Jesuits; Martyr (Quezon City, Philippines - Angk Snuol, Cambodia)
 Rhoel Gallardo (1965–2000), Professed Priest of the Claretians; Martyr (Zambales - Basilan, Philippines)
 Giuseppe Aveni (1918–2010), Professed Priest of the Rogationists of the Heart of Jesus (Messina, Italy - Parañaque, Philippines)
 Laureana Franco (1936–2011), Layperson of the Diocese of Pasig; Member of the Legion of Mary (Manila, Philippines)
 Darwin Ramos (1994–2012), Young Layperson of the Diocese of Cubao (Quezon City, Philippines)

Candidates for sainthood
 Diego de Herrera (1521–1576), Professed Priest of the Augustinians (Spain - Catanduanes, Philippines)
 Pedro de Agurto (1544–1608), Professed Priest of the Augustinians; Bishop of Cebu (Mexico City, Mexico - Cebu, Philippines)
 Margarita Roxas de Ayala (1815–1869), Layperson of the Archdiocese of Manila (Manila, Philippines)
 Fausta Labrador (1858–1942), Layperson of the Diocese of Lucena (Quezon, Philippines)
 Francis Vernon Douglas (1910–1943), Priest of the Missionary Society of Saint Columban; Martyr (Wellington, New Zealand - Laguna, Philippines)
 Donato Guimbaolibot (1866–1949), Priest of the Diocese of Borongan (Eastern Samar, Philippines)
 Aurora Antonia Aragon-Quezon (1888–1949), Layperson  of the Diocese of Cubao (Aurora - Nueva Ecija, Philippines)
 Juan Nepomuceno (1892–1973) and Teresa Gomez Nepomuceno (1893–1970), Layperson of the Archdiocese of San Fernando; Members of the Secular Franciscans (Pampanga, Philippines)
 Natividad Zialcita (Mary Cecilia of Jesus) (1908–1982), Professed Religious of the Discalced Carmelite Nuns (Manila - Batangas, Philippines)
 Roderick Flores (1969–1984), Young Layperson of the Archdiocese of Manila (Manila, Philippines)
 Rosaleo (Rudy) Romano (1940–1985), Professed Priest of the Redemptorists; Martyr (Manila - Cebu, Philippines)
 Ezequiel Barangan (1916–1987), Layperson of the Archdiocese of Cebu; Founder of the Servants of Our Lady of Peace (Cebu, Philippines)
 Victorina Vicente (Mary Therese of the Holy Face) (1921–1995), Founder of the Sisters of the Holy Face of Jesus and the Adoration Sisters of the Holy Face of Jesus (Manila, Philippines)
 Justin Daniel Bataclan (1986–2007), Seminarian of the Society of Saint Paul (Paulines); Martyr (Cubao, Philippines)
 James Reuter (1916–2012), Professed Priest of the Jesuits (New Jersey, USA - Manila, Philippines)
 Ivan Rolfe Banaag (2000-2013), Child of the Diocese of Kalookan; Member of the "Ave Maria" Community (Manila, Philippines)
 Ricardo Tito Vidal (1931–2017), Archbishop of Cebu; Cardinal (Marinduque - Cebu, Philippines)
 Leticia Tordesillas Albert (1927–2019), Layperson of the Diocese of Bacolod; Founder of the Marian Missionaries of the Holy Cross (Negros Occidental, Philippines)

Group martyrs
This sections conclude the list of martyrs pending for the Cause for Sainthood. Majority of them are underway for canonization proposed by the CCS.

 Jesuit Martyrs in Micronesia, Jesuit and lay missionaries in Guam and the Federated States of Micronesia who died for the Christian faith and mission. Companion martyrs of Pedro Calungsod and Diego Luis de San Vitores. 

 Luis de Medina
 Hipolito de la Cruz
 Lorenzo
 Diego Bazan
 Damian Bernal
 Nicolas de Figueroa
 Francisco Esquerra
 Pedro Diaz
 Antonio Maria de San Basilio
 Sebasian de Monroy
 Andrés de la Cruz
 Manuel Solorzano
 Juan de los Reyes
 Balthasar Dubois
 Teofilo de Angelis
 Felipe Songsong
 Unnamed companions

 De La Salle Martyrs of 1945, The Companion Martyrs of William Kelley (Egbert Xavier). All Professed Religious' of the Brothers of the Christian Schools (De La Salle Brothers)
 John Concoran (Flavius Leo)
 Born: June 13, 1876 – Castlecomer, Kilkenny, Ireland
 Wilhelm Hengelbrock (Mutwald William)
 Born: November 10, 1907 – Osnabruck, Germany
 Alois Seipel (Paternus Paul)
 Born: March 21, 1908 – Marborn, Steinau an der Strasse, Main-Kinzig, Germany
 Wilhelm Spieker (Arkadius Maria)
 Born: November 10, 1910 – Kassel, Germany
 Joseph Hastreiter (Gerfreid Joseph)
 Born: August 23, 1912 – Furth im Wald, Cham, Germany
 Lorenz Kreitner (Hartmann Hubert)
 Born: October 23, 1912 – Mannheim, Germany
 Johann Nepomuk Meier (Maximin Maria)
 Born: September 30, 1913 – Frommersbach, Zerf, Trier-Saarburg, Germany
 Hermann Joseph Gelb (Berthwin Philibert)
 Born: October 13, 1913 – Hockenheim, Rhein-Neckar-Kreis, Germany
 Helmut Jakob Wegner (Romuald Suxtus)
 Born: August 29, 1914 – Ludwigshafen, Germany
 Gyula Miklos (De La Salle Janos Baptista)
 Born: 1918 – Budapest, Hungary
 Johannes Kuntz (Freidebert Johannes)
 Born: July 15, 1915 – Rheinfelden, Lorrach, Germany
 Ernst Kammerling (Lambert Romanus)
 Born: April 28, 1917 – Erkelenz, Heinsburg, Germany
 Alfons Bender (Adolf Gebhard)
 Born: May 12, 1914 – Herdorf, Altenkirchen, Germany
 Joseph Biely (Alemond Lucian)
 Born: 1917 – Slovak Republic
 Konrad Wehle (Viktorinus Heinrich)
 Born: November 21, 1914 – Grunmettstetten, Freudenstadt, Germany
 Died: February 12, 1945 – Malate, Manila, Philippines
 Religious Martyrs of Santo Tomas, professed religious' of the Missionary Sisters Servants of the Holy Spirit, martyred on March 15, 1945.
 Anna Unterscher (Adelheida)
 Born: July 27, 1898 – Höhenmoos, Rohrdorf, Rosenheim, Germany
 Margareta Nieder (Aloysius)
 Born: March 16, 1903 – Illingen, Neurkirchen, Germany
 Agnes Hoffman (Ansberta)
 Born: December 07, 1903 – Answeiler, Marpingen, Sankt Wendel, Germany
 Paula Diancourt (Benedicta)
 Born: October 6, 1899 – Dortmund, Erzdiözese Paderborn, Germany 
 Maria Weisert (Bernia)
 Born: April 08, 1907 – Sigmaringen, Germany
 Palmaria Molina (Celia)
 Born: December 02, 1908 – Tayum, Abra, Philippines
 Petronilla Arjonilla Coral (Cesaria)
 Born: April 29, 1907 – Mérida, Yucátan, Mexico
 Maria Klara Schnettler (Cleophana)
 Born: July 14, 1898 – Hagen, Germany
 Sophie Hörth (Franciscetta)
 Born: July 15, 1903 – Neusatz, Bühl, Germany
 Maria Piebler (Gumberta)
 Born: August 30, 1911 – Waidhofen an der Ybbs, Austria
 Elisabet Faulstich (Isburga)
 Born: September 20, 1908 – Cologne, Germany
 Elisabeth Maria Anna Hartelt (Passima)
 Born: July 15, 1903 – Niesse, Opole, Poland
 Elisabeth Schofs (Placida)
 Born: July 15, 1884 – Tönisvorst, Viersen, Germany
 Margarete Mzyk (Richarde)
 Born: April 03, 1910 – Königshütte, Poland
 Bernardina Jurcovic (Victimaria)
 Born: October 25, 1913 – Vištuk, Pezinok, Slovakia
 Died: March 15, 1945 – Santo Tomas, Batangas, Philippines
 Vincentian Martyrs of the Philippines, priests and religious' of the Congregation of the Mission (Vincentians)
 Alfonso Sandaña Díez, priest
 Born: January 06, 1884 – Tardajos, Burgos, Spain
 Died: September 20, 1942 – Mantalongon, Dalaguete, Cebu, Philippines
 Aniano González Moreno, priest
 Born: April 25, 1890 – Isar, Burgos, Spain
 Died: October 21, 1944 – Baguio, Philippines
 Prisciano González Moreno, priest
 Born: October 12, 1885 – Isar, Burgos, Spain
 Crispín Gómez Vallejo, priest
 Born: December 04, 1895 – Hontauas, Burgos, Spain
 Rafael Martínez Rojo, brother
 Born: October 24, 1876 – Ferrero, León, Spain
 Gumersindo Novero, seminarian
 Born: Unknown in Cavite, Philippines
 Died: February 08, 1945 – Mandaluyong, Manila, Philippines
 José Tejada Merino, priest
 Born: March 18, 1892 – Covarrubias, Burgos, Spain
 Luis Ejeda Martínez, priest
 Born: August 18, 1881 – Albarracin, Teruel, Spain
 Adolfo Soto de Celis, priest
 Born: March 17, 1884 – Rebolledo, Burgos, Spain
 Julio Ruiz Sánchez, priest
 Born: May 22, 1890 – Villodrigo, Palencia, Spain
 José Fernández Fernández, priest
 Born: October 24, 1891 – Madrid, Spain
 José Aguirreche Aguirre, priest
 Born: August 27, 1891 – Régil, Guipúzcoa, Spain
 Antolín Marcos Pardo, brother
 Born: September 01, 1879 – Pedrosa de Río Úrbel, Burgos, Spain
 Valentín Santidrián Bermejo, brother
 Born: February 12, 1901 – Villadiego, Burgos, Spain
 Gregorio Induráin Echarte, brother
 Born: 1870 – Ozcoidi, Urraúl, Alto, Navarra, Spain
 Alejandro García García, brother
 Born: Unknown in Spain
 Died: February 09, 1945 – San Marcelino, Manila, Philippines
 Jerónimo Pampliega Melgosa, priest
 Born: Unknown in Rabé de las Calzadas, Burgos, Spain
 Died: February 19, 1945 – Intramuros, Manila, Philippines
 Anselmo Andrés, priest
 Born: 1875 – Spain
 Died: February 26, 1945 – Santa Cruz, Manila, Philippines

See also
 List of saints from Asia
 Gomburza

References

Bibliography
 Moll, Helmut. ZEUGEN FÜR CHRISTUS (Das deutsche Martyrologium des 20. Jahrhunderts), 2015. .
 Facebook: Friends of Bro. Richie Fernando, SJ (group page)

Filipino
Filipino Roman Catholic saints
Saints
Saints